Tima is a genus of hydrozoans in the family Eirenidae.

Species
The genus contains the following species:

Tima bairdii (Johnston, 1833)
Tima flavilabris Eschscholtz, 1829
Tima formosa L. Agassiz, 1862
Tima nigroannulata Calder et al., 2021
Tima saghalinensis Bigelow, 1913

References

Eirenidae
Hydrozoan genera